Ptychadena neumanni is a species of frog in the family Ptychadenidae.
It is endemic to Ethiopia.

Its natural habitats are subtropical or tropical moist lowland forest, subtropical or tropical moist montane forest, subtropical or tropical moist shrubland, subtropical or tropical high-elevation shrubland, subtropical or tropical high-elevation grassland, rivers, intermittent rivers, swamps, freshwater marshes, intermittent freshwater marshes, arable land, rural gardens, heavily degraded former forest, ponds, and canals and ditches.
It is threatened by habitat loss.

References

Ptychadena
Amphibians of Ethiopia
Endemic fauna of Ethiopia
Taxonomy articles created by Polbot
Amphibians described in 1924
Fauna of the Ethiopian Highlands